Prodoxus ochrocarus is a moth of the family Prodoxidae. It is found in south-eastern Arizona, United States. The habitat consists of dry oak-pine forests.

The larvae feed on Yucca schottii. They bore in the floral rachis of their host plant.

References

Moths described in 1967
Prodoxidae